USS Negwagon may refer to operated by the United States Navy:

 was a tugboat acquired by the U.S. Navy in 1943
 was a tugboat acquired by the U.S. Navy in 1975

United States Navy ship names